Barking Park is a public park covering 30 hectares to the northeast of Barking town centre in east London. It was opened as the Recreation Ground in 1898 by the Barking Town Urban District Council and is now the oldest public park in the London Borough of Barking and Dagenham. It lies north of Longbridge Road and south of the neighbourhood of Loxford, with the northern boundary of the park along Loxford Water also the borough boundary with Redbridge.

History
The classic Victorian park for the urban district of Barking Town was established from land acquired in 1896. It was officially opened on 9 April 1898 by Councillor C. L. Beard JP, Chairman of Barking Town Urban District Council.

Rowing boats were introduced first, and then on 1 April 1953, motor boats and a Mississippi style paddle steamer called Phoenix II made their debut. The paddle steamer continued to operate on the lake until 1967.

The park contains a war memorial, renovated in 2000, for men of the Barking Town Urban District who fell in World War I and World War II. 

A lido was built in 1931 but this was closed permanently in 1988. The longstanding park cafe was demolished and a roller-skating park built on the site.

In 2006 the council received stage one funding from the Heritage Lottery Fund to develop a proposal for restoration and improvement of the park. Funding of over £3 million was approved, and works were completed between 2010 and 2012, including two lengthy new pathways, a children's play area and splash park.

Features
Facilities include tennis and basketball courts, two bowling greens (indoor and outdoor), a children's playground, a waterpark, football pitches and a flower garden.

Barking Park Light Railway

Barking Park Light Railway, a miniature passenger railway, opened in the early 1950s. It originally consisted of three coaches hauled by a steam locomotive named "The Empress", running over a length of  gauge track, from the main park entrance at Longbridge Road to a turntable at the boating lake.

About halfway along the line, trains went through a gated level crossing. When trains were not running, the level crossing afforded access to the park from the adjacent Park Avenue, but this side entrance has now been permanently closed.

The railway ran until 2005 when it was closed by the owner, who felt that it was no longer cost effective to maintain and repair the train; however, the railway has since been redeveloped by a father & son team who bought the line from the previous owner. It now features new trains, and new  gauge track, with wheelchair-friendly station access. The new train service ran a few times during 2008 but the official grand re-opening took place at Easter in 2009. The previous level crossing was removed.

Events
Every year on Remembrance Day (usually the 2nd Sunday in November) a commemorative ceremony is held at the war memorial preceded by music from a local marching band.

Barking parkrun takes place in the park every Saturday morning at 9am.

References

External links
 Barking Park, Barking and Dagenham Council

Parks and open spaces in the London Borough of Barking and Dagenham
Barking Park Light Railway
7¼ in gauge railways in England